Koffi Christian Romaric N'Dri (born 4 June 1983), commonly known as Romaric, is an Ivorian former professional footballer. A versatile midfielder, he could play as either a defensive or central midfielder.

He played in six countries, mainly France and Spain. He made 149 Ligue 1 appearances in the former for Le Mans and Bastia, and played 121 La Liga games in the latter for Sevilla, Espanyol and Zaragoza.

In an eight-year international career for the Ivory Coast, Romaric went to two World Cups and three Africa Cup of Nations tournaments, finishing as runners-up in the 2008 edition of the latter.

Club career

Early years
Born in Abidjan, Romaric started his career at the famed youth academy of hometown club ASEC Mimosas, moving to K.S.K. Beveren in 2003.

In his second season in Belgium, he scored a career-best 13 goals in 32 games, but his team narrowly avoided relegation from the Pro League.

Le Mans
In May 2005, Romaric joined French club Le Mans UC72. In late August, however, he was involved in a serious car accident, fracturing his collarbone and taking a blow to the head close to Liège, in Belgium.

Romaric quickly recovered from his injuries and established himself in the team's starting eleven. In 2006–07, he scored five goals in 35 matches, as Le Mans easily retained its Ligue 1 status (12th position), and was also linked with a move to Paris Saint-Germain as a replacement for departing Vikash Dhorasoo in the January transfer window – nothing came of it eventually; in his last season, he reunited at the Stade Léon-Bollée with compatriot Gervinho, a former teammate at Beveren.

Sevilla
On 21 May 2008, Romaric signed for Sevilla FC in Spain, penning a four-year contract for a fee believed to be around €8 and 10 million, and linking up with countryman Arouna Koné. He scored his first La Liga goal on 7 December, in a 4–3 away win against Real Madrid, and finished his first season with 36 matches (30 starts), as the Andalusians were ranked in third position.

Following the arrival of another Ivorian midfielder, Didier Zokora, Romaric saw his minutes significantly decreased. On 9 January 2010, he netted in a 1–2 home loss against Racing de Santander.

Romaric joined fellow league team RCD Espanyol on a season-long loan at the end of the 2011 summer transfer window. Included in the agreement was an option to make the transfer permanent at the end of the campaign, with the player signing a three-year contract.

Later career

On 26 July 2012, Romaric negotiated a release from Sevilla, and signed a two-year deal with fellow league team Real Zaragoza under his former manager Manolo Jiménez. He played only 14 total matches, as the Aragonese ended the season with relegation, and was sent off in the ninth minute of a 1–0 home loss to Getafe CF on 6 October for a foul on Mehdi Lacen.

Romaric returned to France and its top flight on 1 August 2013, joining SC Bastia for two years with the option of a third and reuniting with his Le Mans boss Frédéric Hantz. He played the first four matches in the Corsicans' 2014–15 Coupe de la Ligue campaign, but was an unused substitute for the final, a 4–0 loss to Paris Saint-Germain at the Stade de France.

After being released by the side, he remained a free agent through the summer, before moving on 10 September 2015 to AC Omonia of the Cypriot First Division for the rest of the season. The Nicosia-based club reached the final of the domestic cup, losing 2–1 to Apollon Limassol.

On 14 August 2016, Romaric moved countries again, joining NorthEast United FC for the upcoming edition of the Indian Super League.

International career

Romaric's debut for the Ivory Coast came on 17 August 2005, in a 0–3 friendly loss with France in Montpellier. He was called up for the following year's FIFA World Cup squad, where he appeared in the 1–2 group stage defeat against the Netherlands.

Romaric played for the Elephants in the 2006 Africa Cup of Nations, with the tournament ending with a runner-up position after a final loss to hosts Egypt. He scored his first international goal on 29 March 2009, opening 5–0 home win after just 28 seconds against Malawi for the 2010 World Cup qualifiers; the result was overshadowed by a crush that killed 19 spectators.

Romaric was selected for the final stages in South Africa, where he played in all the games in another group stage exit, netting against North Korea at Mbombela Stadium (3–0). He was, however, not included in the squad for the 2012 Africa Cup of Nations, in which the Ivory Coast finished as runners-up.

International goals

Coaching career

In November 2017, Romaric was named an assistant coach at ASEC Mimosas. He was in charge of the reserve team until ASEC Mimosas dissolved their reserve squad in September 2020.

In 2021, Romaric was named manager for Ivorian third division side Zoman FC. He earned them promotion to the second division in his first season in charge.

In March 2022, Romaric was appointed manager for AFAD Djekanou, in the Ivorian Ligue 1.

Honours

Club
Sevilla
Copa del Rey: 2009–10
Supercopa de España: Runner-up 2010

International
Ivory Coast
Africa Cup of Nations: Runner-up 2006

References

External links

1983 births
Living people
Footballers from Abidjan
Ivorian footballers
Association football midfielders
ASEC Mimosas players
Belgian Pro League players
K.S.K. Beveren players
Ligue 1 players
Le Mans FC players
SC Bastia players
La Liga players
Sevilla FC players
RCD Espanyol footballers
Real Zaragoza players
Cypriot First Division players
AC Omonia players
Indian Super League players
NorthEast United FC players
Ivory Coast international footballers
2006 FIFA World Cup players
2006 Africa Cup of Nations players
2008 Africa Cup of Nations players
2010 FIFA World Cup players
2013 Africa Cup of Nations players
Ivorian expatriate footballers
Expatriate footballers in Belgium
Expatriate footballers in France
Expatriate footballers in Spain
Expatriate footballers in Cyprus
Expatriate footballers in India
Ivorian expatriate sportspeople in Belgium
Ivorian expatriate sportspeople in France
Ivorian expatriate sportspeople in Spain
Ivorian expatriate sportspeople in Cyprus